is an above ground metro station located in Meitō-ku, Nagoya, Aichi Prefecture, Japan operated by the Nagoya Municipal Subway's Higashiyama Line. It is located 19.3 rail kilometers from the terminus of the Higashiyama Line at Takabata Station.

History
Hongō Station was opened on 1 April 1969. The wicket gates were automated to use the Manaca smart card system from 11 February 2011.

Lines

 (Station number: H21)

Layout
Hongō Station has two elevated opposed side platforms.

Platforms

Buses
Nagoya Inter Bus stop
It takes about 4 minutes from the station to the bus stop.

References

External links

 Hongō Station official web site 

Railway stations in Japan opened in 1969
Railway stations in Aichi Prefecture